Saru Kola (also Romanized as Sārū Kolā) is a village in Kuhsaran Rural District, in the Central District of Qaem Shahr County, Mazandaran Province, Iran.

Demographics

2006 Census
At the 2006 census, its population was 2,470, in 709 families.

References 

Populated places in Qaem Shahr County